South Airlines was a charter airline based in Odesa, Ukraine.

History
The airline was registered in 1999 in Odesa, Ukraine. In 2000, the company was certified by the State Aviation Service of Ukraine. South Airlines operated scheduled and charter flights. In the beginning, the company operated with 6 types of aircraft: Antonov An-24, Antonov An-30, Antonov An-140, Yakovlev Yak-40, Let L-410 Turbolet and Tupolev Tu-134. The airline's license was revoked by the aviation authority in February 2013.

Fleet
As of 14 February 2013, the South Airlines is reported to have had only three aircraft (excluding the An-24 lost in the 13 February air disaster in Donetsk), with types of them being an Antonov An-24RV, Embraer EMB-500, Saab 340B and Yakovlev Yak-42. The South Airlines fleet consisted of the following aircraft (as of December 2012):

Accidents and incidents
 On 13 February 2013, South Airlines Flight 8971 crashed when the plane overshot the runway as it attempted an emergency landing at Donetsk International Airport.

References

External links

Official website 

Defunct airlines of Ukraine
Airlines established in 1999
1999 establishments in Ukraine
Airlines disestablished in 2013
2013 disestablishments in Ukraine